Kord Lar or Kordlar may refer to:
Kord Lar, Ardabil
Kordlar, Ahar, East Azerbaijan Province
Kordlar-e Tarancheh, Ahar County, East Azerbaijan Province
Kordlar, Kaleybar, East Azerbaijan Province
Kordlar, Osku, East Azerbaijan Province
Kordlar, Tabriz, East Azerbaijan Province
Kordlar, West Azerbaijan